Global Association of Risk Professionals (GARP) is a not-for-profit organization and a membership association for risk managers. Its services include setting standards, training, education, industry networking, and promoting risk management practices. Founded in 1996 and headquartered in Jersey City, New Jersey, with additional offices in London, Washington, D.C., Beijing, and Hong Kong. GARP offers several foundational and certificate programs, the best known of which is the Financial Risk Manager (FRM) certification.

GARP also runs initiatives such as the GARP Risk Institute (GRI) and GARP Benchmarking Initiative (GBI) for research and thought leadership efforts within the risk purview.

History
GARP was founded in 1996 by Marc Lore and Lev Borodovsky, two risk managers. They had been meeting once a week at a New York pub to talk about their chosen field with other risk colleagues and decided that a more formal organization would benefit other risk professionals. About six months later, they had 250 members from 23 countries. Before long, local chapters from around the world had been established by regional directors, offering programs for local members.

In 1997, a year after they founded GARP, Lore and Borodovsky introduced the Financial Risk Manager (FRM) certification.

According to GARP, as of 2021, it has 279,000 members in more than 195 countries and regions.

Financial Risk Manager (FRM)
The Financial Risk Manager (FRM) is a Master's degree equivalent professional designation issued by GARP. 
The FRM is well regarded, one of the flagship certifications for financial risk professionals, along with the PRM offered by the Professional Risk Managers' International Association.

FRMs possess specialized knowledge in assessing risk and typically work for major banks, insurance companies, accounting firms, regulatory agencies, and asset management firms.
Certificants are in more than 190 countries and territories worldwide, and have taken an average of two years to earn their Certification.

Candidates must pass two FRM exams and attain 2 years of relevant practical work experiences prior to being certified.

The curriculum incorporates the major strategic disciplines of risk management – market risk, credit risk, operational risk, and investment management – with requisite underlying knowledge. The exams:
The tools used to assess financial risk: Foundations of Risk Management; Quantitative Analysis; Financial Markets and Products; Valuation and Risk Models.
Application: Market Risk Measurement and Management; Credit Risk Measurement and Management; Operational- and Integrated Risk Management; Risk Management and Investment Management; Current Issues in Financial Markets.

The FRM curriculum is incorporated into several "partner university" programs and syllabi. According to GARP's Annual Report 2021, there are 70,343 FRMs around the world as of end of 2021.

Other certificate programs
GARP offers three role-based risk certifications – the Financial Risk Manager (FRM), the Energy Risk Professional (ERP), and the Sustainability and Climate Risk (SCR).
It also offers two foundational courses in risk management with its  Foundations of Financial Risk and Financial Risk and Regulation programs. The ERP certification will officially be discontinued after its last offering of exams in 2021 due to the transitions in the energy marketplace.

Additional to these, it provides on-going education through its Continuing Professional Development programming.

See also
 Professional Risk Managers' International Association
 Financial risk management
Institute of Risk Management
 Professional certification
 Risk and Insurance Management Society
 American Risk and Insurance Association
 Association of Insurance and Risk Managers in Industry and Commerce

References

External links
 

Risk management in business
International professional associations
Non-profit organizations based in New Jersey
Business and finance professional associations
Organizations established in 1996
Jersey City, New Jersey